Ferdinand Panke (8 November 1922 – 7 March 1996) was a German water polo player. He competed in the men's tournament at the 1952 Summer Olympics.

References

1922 births
1996 deaths
German male water polo players
Olympic water polo players of Germany
Water polo players at the 1952 Summer Olympics
Place of birth missing